The 2018–19 EHF Champions League group stage began on 12 September 2018 and concluded on 3 March 2019. A total of 28 teams competed for 14 places in the knockout stage of the 2018–19 EHF Champions League.

Draw
The draw for the group stage was held on 29 June 2018.

Seedings
The seedings were announced on 20 June 2018.

Format
In each group, teams played against each other in a double round-robin format, with home and away matches. After completion of the group stage matches, the teams advancing to the knockout stage were determined in the following manner:

Groups A and B – the top team qualified directly for the quarter-finals, and the five teams ranked 2nd–6th advanced to the first knockout round.
Groups C and D – the top two teams from both groups contested a playoff to determine the last two sides joining the ten teams from Groups A and B in the first knockout round.

Tiebreakers
In the group stage, teams were ranked according to points (2 points for a win, 1 point for a draw, 0 points for a loss). After completion of the group stage, if two or more teams had the same number of points, the ranking was determined as follows:

Highest number of points in matches between the teams directly involved;
Superior goal difference in matches between the teams directly involved;
Highest number of goals scored in matches between the teams directly involved (or in the away match in case of a two-team tie);
Superior goal difference in all matches of the group;
Highest number of plus goals in all matches of the group;
If the ranking of one of these teams is determined, the above criteria are consecutively followed until the ranking of all teams is determined. If no ranking can be determined, a decision shall be obtained by EHF through drawing of lots.

Groups
The matchdays were 12–16 September, 19–23 September, 26–30 September, 3–7 October, 10–14 October, 1–4 November, 7–11 November, 14–18 November, 21–25 November, 28 November–2 December 2018. For Groups A and B, additional matchdays included, 6–10 February, 13–17 February, 20–24 February and 27 February–3 March 2019.

Group A

Group B

Group C

Group D

Playoffs

Matches

Sporting CP won 59–57 on aggregate.

Wisła Płock won 49–46 on aggregate.

References

External links
Official website

Group stage